"Face the Day" is a song recorded by Austrian singer Natália Kelly. It was released on 12 July 2013 as the second single of Natalia Kelly, the debut album of the singer.

Track listing 
Face the Day – Single 
 Face the Day – 3:29
 Face the Day (Radio Edit) – 3:21

Music video 
The music video was published on 16 July 2013.

References 

2013 songs